Johann August Ephraim Goeze (28 May 1731 – 27 June 1793) was a German zoologist, born in Aschersleben. He is known for the discovery of tardigrades, also called water bears. He was the son of Johann Heinrich and Catherine Margarete (née Kirchhoff). He studied theology at University of Halle. He married Leopoldine Maria Keller in 1770, by whom he had four children. He died in Quedlinburg.

He did much work with aquatic invertebrates, particularly insects and worms. In 1773, he was the first to describe tardigrades. In 1784, Goeze perceived the similarities between the heads of tapeworms found in the human intestinal tract and the invaginated heads of Cysticercus cellulosae in pigs.

Works
Goeze, J. A. E. 1776. Verzeichnisse der Namen von Insecten und Wurmern, welche in dem Rosel, Kleemann und De Geer vorkommen. Naturforscher 9: 61-78 [1776], 81-85.
with Charles De Geer Abhandlungen zur Geschichte der Insekten. Aus dem Französischen übersetzt und mit Anmerkungen hrsg. von Johann August Ephraim Goeze. Leipzig: J. C. Müller, 1776–1783.
Goeze, J. A. E. 1782. Des Herrn Baron Karl Degeer Koniglichen Hofmarschalls .... Abhandlungen zur Geschichte der Insekten aus dem Franzosischen ubersetzt und mit Anmerkungen herausgegeben. Volume 6. 200 pp., 30 pls. Raspe, Nurnberg.
Goeze, J. A. E. 1783. Entomologische Beyträge zu des Ritter Linné zwölften Ausgabe des Natursystems. Dritten Theiles vierter Band. - pp. I-XX, 1-178. Leipzig. (Weidmanns Erben und Reich).

References

Sources
 Allgemeine Deutsche Biographie (ADB). Band 9, Duncker & Humblot, Leipzig 1879, S. 530.online
 Allen G. Debus (dir.) (1968). World Who’s Who in Science. A Biographical Dictionary of Notable Scientists from Antiquity to the Present. Marquis-Who’s Who (Chicago) : xvi + 1855 p.

1731 births
1793 deaths
German lepidopterists
People from the Principality of Halberstadt
University of Halle alumni
People from Aschersleben
18th-century German zoologists